Iveta Staša-Šaršūne (born June 9, 1976) is a Latvian curler from Riga, Latvia.

Career
Staša-Šaršūne skipped the Latvian team at three World Women's Curling Championships. At the 2010 Ford World Women's Curling Championship in Swift Current, Canada, her team placed last with a 1-10 record. At the 2013 World Women's Curling Championship at home in Riga, Latvia, she did not improve her ranking, placing last once again with the same record as in 2010. In 2019, she placed last once again, this time with a 1-11 record at the 2019 World Women's Curling Championship in Silkeborg, Denmark. Her best finish at the European Curling Championships was in 2018 in Tallinn, Estonia where her team placed fifth with a 4-5 record, including defeating higher-ranked Scotland and Eve Muirhead.

She is currently one of the coaches of the Latvian women's junior team.

References

External links
 

Latvian female curlers
Living people
1976 births
Latvian curling champions
Latvian curling coaches
21st-century Latvian women